Isaac Collins is an American gridiron football coach and former player. He is currently the head football coach at Albright College, a position he took over prior to the 2022 season. He was the defensive backs and special teams coach at Bucknell University, before being promoted to defensive coordinator prior to the 2021 spring season. Collins served as the head coach at Widener University in Chester, Pennsylvania from 2010 to 2012 and Seton Hill University in Greensburg, Pennsylvania from 2013 to 2018.

Head coaching record

College

References

External links
 Albright profile
 Bucknell profile
 Seton Hill profile

Year of birth missing (living people)
Living people
American football running backs
Albright Lions football coaches
Bucknell Bison football coaches
Columbia Lions football coaches
Delaware Fightin' Blue Hens football coaches
Hobart Statesmen football coaches
Holy Cross Crusaders football coaches
Lehigh Mountain Hawks football coaches
Rochester Yellowjackets football players
Seton Hill Griffins football coaches
The Citadel Bulldogs football coaches
Widener Pride football coaches